Louis-Eugène Simonis (11 July 1810, in Liège – 11 July 1893, in Koekelberg) was a Belgian sculptor.

Career
Simonis studied under François-Joseph Dewandre at the Academie Royale des Beaux-Arts in Liège and at the age of nineteen went to Italy, where he continued his studies in Bologna and Rome. When he returned to Belgium he accepted an instructor position at the Liege Academy.  Later he moved to Brussels, where he became the director of the Académie Royale des Beaux-Arts.  Among his many students were the Belgian sculptors Thomas Vinçotte, Julien Dillens, and Charles Samuel.

The square in Brussels, where Simonis had his studio, was given the name Eugène Simonis Square in his honor. A metro station in Brussels, completed in 1982, bears his name. In 2007, a bust of  Simonis by Annie Junger was unveiled at Simonis Square.

Honours 
 1881: Grand Officer in the Order of Leopold.

Selected works
Mons
 Leopold I of Belgium, at the railway station

Bruges
 Simon Stevin, 1846, 

Brussels
 Godfrey of Bouillon (1848), Royal Square
 Sculptures for the Congress Column, including both lions and one (of four) sitting statue which represents the Freedom of Worship.  (The statue of King Leopold I on top of the column was made by Guillaume Geefs.)
 Bas-relief  L'Harmonie des Passions humaines decorant  (Harmony of the Arts) on the pediment of the La Monnaie theatre.

Liege
 André Dumont, (1886)
 Walthère Frère-Orban,

Notes

References
 Jordens-Leroy, Chantal (1990) Un sculpteur belge du XIXe Siecle: Louis-Eugene Simonis Académie Royale de Belgique,  Brussels, 

1810 births
1893 deaths
19th-century Belgian sculptors
19th-century Belgian male artists
Members of the Royal Academy of Belgium